Pine Hill Airport was an airfield operational in the mid-20th century in Lancaster, Massachusetts.

References

Defunct airports in Massachusetts
Airports in Worcester County, Massachusetts
Buildings and structures in Lancaster, Massachusetts